Lidija Nikolaevna Figner (1853-1920), was a Russian revolutionary and a prominent member of the Narodniks. She was the sister of Vera Figner.

References 
 V. N. Figner, Autobiografia, 1926, Dizionario enciclopedico Granat, v. 40.

1853 births
1920 deaths
People from Tetyushsky District
People from Tetyushsky Uyezd
Russian people of German descent
Russian nobility
Narodniks
Narodnaya Volya
Russian revolutionaries
Female revolutionaries